Stigmella heteromelis is a moth of the family Nepticulidae. It is found in California, United States.

The wingspan is 5-6.5 mm.

The larvae feed on Heteromeles species, including Heteromeles arbutifolia. They mine the leaves of their host plant.

External links
A taxonomic revision of the North American species of Stigmella (Lepidoptera: Nepticulidae)

Nepticulidae
Moths of North America
Moths described in 1982